LSCM may refer to:

 Laser scanning confocal microscopy
 Least squares conformal map, a technique used in 3D texture mapping
 Library Services and Content Management, a department of the Federal Depository Library Program
 Low Speed Collision Mitigation, a safety mechanism for cars.

LSCM may refer to:

 logistic and Supply chain management